Irène Mélikoff (7 November 1917 – 8 January 2009) was a Russian-born French Turkologist with Azerbaijani ancestry.

Life 
Mélikoff's ancestors had been major industrialists in Baku, but she was born in the Russian capital. The family fled revolutionary Russia soon after the Communist takeover within weeks of her birth, arriving in France in 1919, when she was just two. There she graduated in Oriental languages from Sorbonne University in Paris. She gained her doctorate there in 1957.

Mélikoff married Faruk Sayar, the son of the Turkish mathematician Salih Zeki Sayar, in 1940 and moved to Turkey in 1941 with her husband. Returning to France in 1948, she conducted research in the field of Turkology and wrote famous works. Her research has covered Turkey, the Balkans, Azerbaijan, Iran and Central Asia. She was the head of the faculty of Turkology and Iran at the University of Strasbourg. Mélikoff has been elected a member of many international scientific organizations, including well-known societies such as Asia Society and Ernest Renan Society.

She long headed the Turkic and Iranian Studies Institute at Strasbourg University and was one of the co-founders of Turcica magazine as well as chairwoman of the Turkic Development Group. She was the author of a number of publications on Turkic studies - particularly on Sufism, the Alevis and Bektashis in Turkey - and received more than ten prestigious awards for her contribution to Oriental studies. She was an honorary doctor at Baku State University.

Mélikoff was editor-in-chief of Turkika, the only Turkology magazine published in Western Europe, also visited Tabriz in Iran and collected rich material about her beloved Shah Ismail Khatai. The prominent scientist praised Azerbaijani literature and its prominent representatives, and expressed her admiration for MF Akhundov's work.

She died from a serious illness in January 2009 in Strasbourg.

Relations with Azerbaijan 
In an interview, she expressed her love for Azerbaijan and said that she first came into contact with Azerbaijan in 1968 while in Central Asia. At that time, she communicated with Azerbaijanis who came to the scientific conference. He also studied the history and literature of Azerbaijan.

After the Soviet Army's massacre in Baku on January 20, 1990, Melikoff rallied in Paris with many members of the Azerbaijani exile.

Family 
Her father was the oil tycoon, merchant, intellectual and philanthropist Iskander bey Malikov, and her mother was the Russian ballerina Yevgenya Nikiferovna Mokshanova. In 1940, she married Farooq Sayar, the son of the Turkish mathematician Saleh Zaki Sayar. The marriage later ended in divorce. From this marriage, she had three daughters, Sonya, Ladin and Shirin Laura.

Following in her mother's footsteps, her daughter Shirin Malikova specialized in Azerbaijani literature and received a doctorate. In October 2019, she was awarded the Jubilee Medal of the Democratic Republic of Azerbaijan by the Permanent Representative of Azerbaijan to the Council of Europe.

Bibliography 
 La Geste de Melik Danişmend (Paris, 1960)
 Abu Muslim, le “Portre-Hache” du Khorassan dans la tradition épique Turco-Iraienne, (Paris, 1962)
 Uyur İdik Uyardılar Alevîlik-Bektaşîlik Araştırmaları (Istanbul, 1992)
 De L’épopée au Mythe/Itinéraire Turcologique, (Istanbul 1995)
 Hacı Bektaş/Efsaneden Gerçeğe  
 Hadji Bektach: Un Mythe et ses avatars/Genèse et évolution du Soufisme populaire en Turquie, Leiden  (New York-Köln, 1998)
 Tarihî ve Kültürel Boyutlarıyla Türkiye’de Alevîler-Bektaşîler-Nusayrîler (Istanbul, 1999)
 Kırklar’ın Cemi’nde (Istanbul, 2008)<

She has written more than 70 scientific articles.

References

External links
 Institut Français d'Etudes Anatoliennes d'Istanbul
 Tribute at Strasbourg University Turkish Studies Department
 Turkologist Melikoff dies at 91
 ANS article on her death

1917 births
2009 deaths
University of Paris alumni
Academic staff of the University of Strasbourg
French orientalists
Russian orientalists
French people of Azerbaijani descent
Russian people of Azerbaijani descent
Writers from Paris
White Russian emigrants to France